Omar Blondin Diop (1946-1973) was a West African anti-imperialist philosopher, artist, and revolutionary.

Life

Born in Niger, he lived in and was politically active in many countries, notably as a student and organizer in France and Senegal. He was active in the Marxist movement while living in Paris, playing his own role as a student radical in the 1967 Jean-Luc Godard film La Chinoise and taking part in the May 68 uprising before he was deported for his political work in 1969. Diop continued his activism back in Senegal, agitating against Leopold Senghor's French-backed government with other young radicals, including his two brothers, in the Movement of Young Marxist–Leninists (MJML) and the Committee for the Initiative for Permanent Revolutionary Action (CIARP). 

While preparing to initiate a guerrilla war against Senegal's government, he was arrested with other radicals and died in prison in 1973. His younger brother Mohamed, an ear-witness from the neighbouring cell, heard him agonise from blows he had received to the neck. This was confirmed by the autopsy conducted by his father, medical doctor Ibrahima Blondin Diop. Faced with the evidence, Dakar’s High Court senior investigating judge, Moustapha Touré, proceeded to convict two prison guards. Judge Touré stated: “The circumstances showed credible and concordant evidence that indicated that the suicide, officially mentioned to justify the death of Omar Blondin Diop, was, in fact, a cover-up." Soon after the indictment, the judge was removed from the case and replaced by another, who ended the legal proceedings a year and a half later, claiming the case was not within his jurisdiction. Omar Blondin Diop has still not received justice for a death many of his supporters believe was an assassination.

References 

1946 births
1973 deaths
Senegalese Marxists
Senegalese activists
African revolutionaries